Antonio Guerra (died 1500) was a Roman Catholic prelate who served as Bishop of Umbriatico (1495–1500).

Biography
On 4 Feb 1495, Antonio Guerra was appointed during the papacy of Pope Alexander VI as Bishop of Umbriatico.
He served as Bishop of Umbriatico until his death on 4 Aug 1500.

References

External links and additional sources
 (for Chronology of Bishops) 
 (for Chronology of Bishops) 

15th-century Italian Roman Catholic bishops
16th-century Italian Roman Catholic bishops
Bishops appointed by Pope Alexander VI
1500 deaths